Guevara (in Basque and officially Gebara) is a small village and former municipality through which the Zadorra River runs. The village is administered by the council of Barrundia and situated in the province of Álava, in the Basque Autonomous Community, Spain. 

There is a local festival dedicated to the Assumption of Mary on August 15.

Historic development
Guevara is first attested in Roman times as lying in the territory of the Varduli, thought to be probably Celts according to ongoing discussion. The name appears as "Gebala", linguistically related to cognate Gothic "gibla" or Greek "kephale", 'head, prominence'. However, no archaeological findings related to that period have been unearthed to date.
  
Records are mute during the early Middle Ages, but we hear of Guevara again in the 11th century in a document referred to the counts of Oñati (Oñate). The place is renowned for the role played by the lords of Guevara in the bloody Basque Party Wars of the late Middle Ages and their castle conspicuous from miles away at the top of a hill. 

On the hill are: 

 The Castle of Guevara: destroyed in the Carlist Wars (19th century), now in ruins.
 Palace of the Guevara family: at the foot.
 Church of the Assumption (Iglesia de la Asunción).

The Brotherhood of Guevara (Hermandad de Guevara) formerly administered the village of Guevara, as well as Elguea, Etura and Urízar, but after the municipal reforms of the 19th century, the Brotherhood was converted into a municipality.  In 1885, the municipality was integrated into that of Barrundia.

Álava